Sarah Engels Lombardi (born 15 October 1992) is a German singer of Italian descent. She is best known for participating in season 8 of Deutschland sucht den Superstar, where she was eliminated from the Top 10, only to return two shows later and eventually become the runner-up.

In 2020, she represented Italy at the Free European Song Contest 2020 with the song "Te Amo Mi Amor", finishing 13th out of 16.

Deutschland sucht den Superstar
Engels also participated in season 7 of Deutschland sucht den Superstar but was eliminated during the recall after her duet with Eugen Flittner. In season 8, she was eliminated in the first Live Show. Later on, she was asked to come back because RTL chief Tom Sänger (not the voters) had eliminated Nina Richel from the show, allegedly for health-reasons.

Pietro Lombardi's brother posted a semi-nude picture of Engels after she had used Pietro's mobile phone to talk to girls. After hearing about what Sarah had done, Lombardi's brother Marco decided to take "revenge" by sharing this semi-nude picture of Engels.

By performance

Personal life

Engels married Pietro Lombardi in March 2013 and changed her name from Engels to Lombardi. On 19 June 2015, their son was born. She announced their separation in October 2016.

Discography

Albums

Singles

References

1992 births
People from Hürth
People from Rhein-Erft-Kreis
Deutschland sucht den Superstar participants
Living people
Masked Singer winners
21st-century German  women  singers
Musicians from Cologne
German people of Italian descent